Helianthus resinosus is a North American species of sunflower known by the common name  sunflower. It is native to the southeastern United States from Mississippi to North Carolina.

Helianthus resinosus  grows in open swamps and meadows, and along roadsides. It is an perennial herb up to 300 cm (10 feet) tall, spreading by means of underground rhizomes. Leaves are up to 20 cm (8 inches) long, dotted with visible resin glands embedded in the leaves. One plant usually produces 1-5 flower heads, each containing 10-20 yellow ray florets surrounding 90 or more yellow disc florets.

References

External links
Alabama Plant Atlas

resinosus
Endemic flora of the United States
Flora of the Southeastern United States
Taxa named by John Kunkel Small
Plants described in 1903